Aleksander Ptak (born November 4, 1977) is a Polish footballer who plays for Miedź Legnica.

Career

Club
Since 1996 to 2005 he has played for GKS Bełchatów. In 2005, he moved to the Dyskobolia Grodzisk Wlkp., which played for two years. In 2007, he joined Zagłębie Lubin.

References

Notes 
 

1977 births
Living people
Polish footballers
GKS Bełchatów players
Zagłębie Lubin players
Miedź Legnica players
Ekstraklasa players
Dyskobolia Grodzisk Wielkopolski players
People from Wałcz
Sportspeople from West Pomeranian Voivodeship
Association football goalkeepers